is a 1971 Japanese historical drama film directed by Masahiro Shinoda, based on the novel of the same name by Shūsaku Endō. It stars Tetsurō Tamba, Mako, Eiji Okada, and Shima Iwashita alongside English actors David Lampson and Don Kenny. Endo co-wrote the screenplay with Masahiro Shinoda. Most of the film's dialogue is in Japanese, though it has short sequences in English. It was entered Un Certain Regard into the 1972 Cannes Film Festival, and won four Mainichi Film Awards including Best Film and Best Director.

The film's themes analyze the conflict of human nature versus divine requirements and their compatibility, life's purpose, the interplay of emotional needs, suffering, and contentment. The storytelling device the film uses is circumstantial and depicts the struggles of life, allegorical presentation, and Christian theology. It is the first of three movie adaptations of the novel, succeeded by the Portuguese Os Olhos da Ásia in 1996 and the 2016 American film of the same name.

Plot
In the 17th century, two Portuguese Jesuit priests, Rodrigo and Garrpe, travel to Japan to proselytize, where Christianity is officially banned. They also search for their mentor, Ferreira, with whom they lost contact five years prior and presume is imprisoned. Rodrigo is patronizing and Garrpe is cautious. The two priests are overwhelmed with the welcome they receive in Japan, but occasionally wish for some comfort food from home.

They travel to the village of Kichijiro, the man who smuggled them into Japan from China. Returning, they hear the officials have arrived to capture the priests. After many of the hidden believers are taken prisoner, the two priests decide to leave but they become separated. Kichijiro finds Rodrigo and joins with him; he confesses to Rodrigo he is a weak person and his family was slaughtered for being Christians. Nagasaki Magistrate Inoue's men capture Rodrigo and throw 300 pieces of silver at Kichijiro (reminiscent of Judas Iscariot). He later gives away the money to a prostitute for emotional support.

Inoue's men imprison Rodrigo and put him on trial. Later, he and other prisoners in the cell are shown Inoue's men punishing a Christian Samurai family where in the end the wife Kiku recants her faith and her husband is dragged away to be executed. Kichijiro, who is troubled, sneaks into the holding cell, asks Rodrigo to forgive him. He says he betrayed Rodrigo because everyone shamed him for recanting his faith and despises anyone who reminds him of it.

Inoue, with the interpreter, invites Rodrigo for a talk in private. Inoue says the Church is unwanted in Japan. He compares Christianity to a concubine who makes trouble for a man's conscience (Japan). Rodrigo says truth of the Church is universal and as the happiness between a man and woman is disturbed, the State disturbs the Church through persecution for not becoming fruitful. Each accuses the other of being ignorant of the other side of the subject. Inoue concludes that he doesn't think Christianity is bad, but he has to forbid it.

Later Rodrigo is taken to the seaside and sees Garrpe, who has been taken prisoner,  along with his Japanese companions. The interpreter tells Rodrigo that Magistrate Inoue wants Rodrigo to witness Garrpe apostatizing his faith and, if he doesn't, all the hidden Christian farmers will be immediately hunted down. While Garrpe's companions are drowned one by one, Garrpe unties his bonds in an attempt to save them. He swims near to the boat where his companions were thrown into the sea, but the soldiers dissuade him with spears which leads to his death. Later, Rodrigo is taken to a Buddhist temple to visit Lord Chuan Sawano. Sawano turns out to be Ferreira, who has apostatized and is working under Inoue as an astronomy scholar, also helping to expose errors and inconsistencies in Bible and Christian teachings. Rodrigo is upset by this revelation; nonetheless, Sawano asks Rodrigo to renounce his faith. Rodrigo rejects the idea. Sawano says he preached in Japan for 20 years, and he knows this is not a land where Christianity can be rooted but a terrifying swamp where seedlings can rot and die and the inculturation of Christianity is the worst.  Rodrigo rejects all these claims and censures him by saying that this wouldn't be the attitude of St. Francis Xavier.

The interpreter takes Rodrigo back to his prison, and he is hung upside down in a pit with a small incision at the back of his ear for the blood to drip slowly. After a short time in a lot of pain, he is taken back to the prison, where he meets Sawano again. When Rodrigo asks about the snoring sound he hears, Sawano says it's not snoring but the whimpering of three Christian believers who have been hung upside down for the past six hours. Sawano says he was in the same cell where Rodrigo is now and was hung for two days and there were five men who were hung in the pit, and he can still hear their voices. Sawano tells the real reason he renounced his faith was not because of the torture, but the absence of God in others' suffering. Rodrigo replies those who are in suffering will receive eternal happiness for their pain. Sawano tells him not to deceive himself, and says if Rodrigo renounces his faith now for the sake of love as Christ would do, those men hung in the pits will be freed and receive immediate care.

The interpreter comes with a fumi-e and encourages Rodrigo to step on it, as it's a mere formality. Sawano supports him by relating it to be a supreme act of love that Christ would have done for his fellow men and chants silently. Rodrigo steps on the fumi-e and a rooster crows twice (reminiscent of Saint Peter's denial). Later, a complacent Rodrigo is shown helping Nagasaki magistrates to identify forbidden Christian objects. Rodrigo is asked to comment on a cup and he says it's not a chalice because the stem would have been longer. The magistrates are impressed with it and give him Kiku as his wife; from that day forward, he is given her dead husband's name Sanemon Okada as Ferreira was given the title of Lord Sawano. A happy Kichijiro is shown sweeping the surroundings.

Cast
 David Lampson as Sebastian Rodrigo
 Don Kenny as Francisco Garrpe
 Tetsurō Tamba as Cristóvão Ferreira
 Mako Iwamatsu as Kichijiro
 Rokko Toura as The Interpreter
 Eiji Okada as Inoue 
 Yoshi Katō as Old Man
 Noboru Matsuhashi as Mokichi
 Shima Iwashita as Kiku
 Yûsuke Takita as Ichizo

References

External links

1971 films
1971 drama films
1970s historical drama films
Japanese historical drama films
1970s Japanese-language films
Films about Catholic priests
Films about Christianity
Films based on Japanese novels
Films based on works by Shūsaku Endō
Films directed by Masahiro Shinoda
Films set in the 1630s
Films set in the 1640s
Films set in feudal Japan
Catholic Church in Japan
Persecution of Christians
Society of Jesus
Toho films
1970s English-language films
1970s Japanese films